TTA may refer to

Tan Tan Airport, Morocco, IATA code
Teacher Training Agency, former name of the Training and Development Agency for Schools, England
Technical Theatre Awards, UK
Terran Trade Authority, the setting for a series of science-fiction books
Tetradecylthioacetic acid, a fatty acid
The Three Amigonauts, a cartoon series
The Tough Alliance, a synthpop duo from Sweden
Thenoyltrifluoroacetone, a chelating agent also commonly known as TTFA
Tibial tuberosity advancement, a knee operation in dogs
Tiny Toon Adventures, an animated television series
Toledo Technology Academy, a public high school in Toledo, Ohio, US
Tomorrowland Transit Authority PeopleMover, in Tomorrowland in Magic Kingdom at Walt Disney World Resort in Orlando, Florida
 Total TEU Allowance
Tramway Touristique de l'Aisne, a tourist tramway in Belgium
Transport Ticketing Authority, Victoria, Australia
Transport triggered architecture, computer processor design
Triangle Transit Authority, a regional transit service in North Carolina, US
Tri-State Transit Authority, a transit service in the Huntington, West Virginia, US area
TTA (codec), True Audio codec
Ṭa (Indic), the eleventh consonant of Indic abugidas
Transfusion-transmitted anaplasmosis, a human bacterial infection caused by blood transfusion
TTA – Racing Elite League, a Swedish touring car championship
TTA, a codon for the amino acid Leucine